Alexey Soloviev (also Aleksei or Soloviev) may refer to the following Russian people:
Alexey Soloviev (boxer) (born 1973)
Aleksei Solovyov (footballer) (born 1996)
Alexei Soloviev (ice dancer) (born 1964)